The Wikipedia Monument, located in Słubice, Poland, is a statue designed by Armenian sculptor Mihran Hakobyan honoring Wikipedia contributors. It was unveiled in Frankfurt Square (Plac Frankfurcki) on 22 October 2014 in a ceremony that included representatives from both local Wikimedia chapters and the Wikimedia Foundation.

Description
The monument depicts four nude figures holding aloft a globe based on the Wikipedia logo, reaching over  up. The fiber-and-resin statue was designed by Armenian-born artist Mihran Hakobyan, who graduated from Collegium Polonicum. It cost about 50,000 złotys (approximately $13,500; €11,700) and was funded by Słubice regional authorities. The monument has the following inscription:With this monument the citizens of Słubice would like to pay homage to thousands of anonymous editors all over the world, who have contributed voluntarily to the creation of Wikipedia, the greatest project co-created by people regardless of political, religious or cultural borders. In the year this monument is unveiled Wikipedia is available in more than 280 languages and contains about 30 million articles. The benefactors behind this monument feel certain that with Wikipedia as one of its pillars the knowledge society will be able to contribute to the sustainable development of our civilization, social justice and peace among nations.

History
Polish Wikipedia is a popular website in Poland and, with over a million articles, the 10th-largest Wikipedia in the world. According to Piotr Łuczyński, deputy mayor, the memorial "will highlight the town’s importance as an academic centre". A Wikimedia Polska representative stated that the organization hopes that this project will "raise awareness of the website and encourage people to contribute."

Dariusz Jemielniak, a professor of management, Wikimedia activist, and an author of the 2014 book Common Knowledge? An Ethnography of Wikipedia, delivered an opening ceremony address.

References

External links

Press release: First-ever Wikipedia Monument unveiled in Poland, Wikimedia Foundation

2014 establishments in Poland
2014 sculptures
Articles containing video clips
Fiberglass sculptures
Monuments and memorials in Poland
Nude sculptures
Outdoor sculptures in Poland
Sculptures by Mihran Hakobyan
Sculptures of men
Sculptures of women
Słubice County
Statues in Poland
Monument